"Finally" is a song written by Gary Chapman, and recorded by American country music artist T. G. Sheppard.  It was released in March 1982 as the second single and title track from the album Finally!.  The song was Sheppard's tenth number one on the country chart.  The single stayed at number one for one week and spent a total of ten weeks on the country chart.

Music video
A music video was produced for the song, a rarity in country music at the time.

Charts

References

1982 singles
1981 songs
T. G. Sheppard songs
Song recordings produced by Buddy Killen
Warner Records singles
Curb Records singles
Songs written by Gary Chapman (musician)